John Harvard may refer to:

 John Harvard (clergyman) (1607–1638), benefactor of Harvard University
 SS John Harvard, a EC2-S-C1 standard Liberty ship built in 1942 and named in his honour
 John Harvard (politician) (1938–2016), journalist, politician and office holder in Manitoba, Canada
 John Harvard (statue), statue of the university's benefactor, in Harvard Yard, Cambridge, Massachusetts
 John Harvard, the mascot of Harvard University's Harvard Crimson athletic teams